Stephen Alathara (born 1 May 1970) is the deputy secretary general of the Conference of Catholic Bishops of India (CCBI). He started as the deputy secretary general of the conference on 10 June 2014. He was appointed to this post three times consecutively in 2014, 2018 and 2022. He is the first priest from Kerala to serve as the deputy secretary general of the national episcopal conference. He is also the National Director of Communio India, Executive Secretary to the CCBI Commission for Boundary, Chief Functionary of the Episcopal Conference, the Director of CCBI Centre., Bangalore, the Director of Shanti Sadan, CCBI Secretariat Extension, Benaulim, Goa and the Editor of the CCBI News.  The Conference of Catholic Bishops of India is the largest canonical national episcopal conference in Asia and the fourth largest in the world. There are 132 dioceses and 182 bishops under the conference.

He is a priest from the Archdiocese of Verapoly, Kerala and a prolific author, columnist, educationist, theologian and visiting professor in various ecclesiastical universities. He is well known for his lectures and workshops. He is the author of 16 books as well as hundreds of articles. His book Introduction to Catechetics is the textbook for Catechetics in many major seminaries in India and abroad.

Biography
Alathara was born on 1 May 1970 as the eldest son of Alathara Joseph and Joan at Moolamattom in Idukki district. He had his education in Govt. L.P. School Kulamavu, SPWHS Alwaye and St. Paul's College Kalamassery. His priestly formation began on 16 June 1985 at St. Joseph Minor Seminary, Kalamassery. After completing his priestly studies at Carmelgiri Seminary and Mangalapuzha Seminary, both in Alwaye, he was ordained to the priesthood on 26 January 1995 by late Archbishop of Verapoly Most Rev. Cornelius Elenjikal.

He has obtained an MTH in Catechetics and an MDHA in Hospital Administration. He also acquired a PhD from the Salesian Pontifical University in Rome  for his dissertation 'The Role of the Teachers in the Moral and Faith Formation of the Children'. He has rendered his service to the Archdiocese of Verapoly as the Assistant Parish Priest of Holy Family Parish, Perumpilly, the vice Rector of the Minor Seminary, the Director of the Catechetical Department, Director of the Family Apostolate, General Convener of the Great Jubilee of Yesu Christhu Jayanthi, the Parish Priest of St. James church, Cheranellur, the Director of the Kristu Jayanthi Hospital, a unit of Lourdes Hospital, He was also the director of the Public Relations Department for the archdiocese and a spokesperson of the Archdiocese of Verapoly.

He served the Catholic Church in Kerala for eight years (2007–2014) as the official spokesperson and Deputy Secretary General of the Kerala Catholic Bishops' Council (KCBC), which is the association of the bishops from three sui iuris Churches, namely Latin, Syro-Malabar and Syro-Malankara. He was the Director of the Pastoral Orientation Centre (POC), which is the common pastoral animation centre of the Church in Kerala for the three individual Churches, located at Cochin, Kerala.

See also
Catholic Church in India

References

1970 births
Living people
21st-century Indian Roman Catholic priests
Indian expatriates in Italy
Salesian Pontifical University alumni